Molde Elite (or Molde HK Elite) is the women's elite team from the handball club Molde Håndballklubb, from Molde, Møre og Romsdal, Norway. The women's team currently competes in REMA 1000-ligaen, the Top Division.

Achievements
Norwegian Cup:
Finalist: 2021

Team

Current squad
Squad for the 2022–23 season

Goalkeeper
 1  Mathilde Berner Rømer
 12  Catharina Fiskerstrand  Broch 
 16  Ine Karlsen Stangvik 
 24  Lise Slemmen Gussiås 
 31  Tina Hustad Holen
RW
 2  Mia Kristine Strand
 28  Anastasija Marsenić 
LW
 5  Rikke Øyerhamn
 8  Vilde Nerås
 18  Torine Hjelme Dalen
Line players
 10  Sherin Obaidli
 20  Synne Fossheim
 22  Helene Voss Sander
 38  Lisa Paulsen Halle

Back players
LB
4  Mona Obaidli
 17  Mie Blegen Stensrud
 19  Celina Vatne
CB
3  Christine Karlsen Alver
6  Thale Rushfeldt Deila
 37  Silje Rekdal
RB
 7  Johanne Halseth Nypan
 11  Elise Skinnehaugen

Transfers
Transfers for the 2023–24 season.

Joining
  Henrikke Hauge Kjølholdt (RW) (from  Tertnes HE)
  Runa Heimsjø Sand (LB) (from  Fredrikstad BK)

 
Leaving
  Elise Skinnehaugen (RB) (to  Toulon Métropole Var Handball)

Technical staff
 Head coach: Tor Odvar Moen
 Assistant coach: Tor Erling Vik

Notable former club and National Team players

  Elke Karsten
  Petra Blazek
  Kristina Logvin
  Iryna Tryzno
  Katsiaryna Silitskaya
  Dayane Rocha
  Nataša Janković
  Ivana Gakidova
  Martine Smeets
  Isabel Blanco
  Tine Kristiansen
  Emilie Hovden
  Ines Khouildi

Notable former club players

  Mariane Oliveira Fernandes
  Caroline Martins
  Melanie Bak
 Hanne Frandsen
  Lærke Sofie Sørensen
  Mie Sørensen
  Sarah Paulsen
  Lynn Molenaar
  Talissa Sabrina Groen
  Ragnhild Valle Dahl
  June Andenæs
  Vera Bekken
  Julie Nygård
  Sara Møller
  Hanne Nilsen Morlandstø
  Rikke Skiri Østigård
  Tonje Haug Lerstad
  Kristin Halvorsen
  Malene Aambakk
  Mathilde Rivas Toft
  Anniken Obaidli
  Lone Vik
  Hege Løken
  Emilie Christensen
  Andrea Hanssen
  Julie Lygren
  Anca Mihaela Stoica
  Sandra Wrede

European record

References

External links
 Official website

Norwegian handball clubs
Handball clubs established in 1961
Sport in Molde
1961 establishments in Norway
Molde